Jinnah Hospital (named after Quaid-e-Azam Muhammad Ali Jinnah, founder of Pakistan), established in 1996 in Lahore, is a teaching hospital in the Pakistani province of Punjab. It is owned by the Government of Punjab, Pakistan.

According to the 'Ranking Web of World Hospitals', Jinnah Hospital, Lahore was the second best public sector hospital in Pakistan in 2016.

Recognition
 Jinnah Hospital, Lahore is accredited by the College of Physicians and Surgeons of Pakistan.

History
It began operations in 1994, with very limited facilities, and was formally inaugurated on 2 February 1996, although with only basic specialties at first. In 2005, it added a new 100 bed Accident & Emergency Department.

The number of patients increased from 500,000 in 2003 to 700,000 in 2007. This increase reflects the faith of general public in this hospital. Jinnah Hospital, Lahore is also on the 'Tertiary Hospitals List' issued by the Government of  Punjab, Pakistan.

Services
 General Medicine 
 General Surgery 
 Neurosurgery
 Peadriatics 
 physiotherapy Department 
 Cardiology/ CCU mmmmm
 ENT 
 Ophthalmology/ Eye 
 Dermatology (Skin) 
 Obstetrics & Gynaecology 
 Cardiac Surgery 
 Pulmonology/ T.B. & Chest 
 Accident and Emergency Department
 Labour Room 
 Trauma Center 
 Orthopaedic Ward
 Oncology
 Psychiatry
 Radiotherapy
 Anaesthesia/ Intensive Care Unit (ICU)
 Plastic Surgery
 Urology
 Burn Center (State of art)
 Paediatric Surgery
 Private Rooms
 Nephrology
 Endocrinology
 Fascio Maxillary Surgery
 Vascular Surgery
 Diabetic Center

References

Hospital buildings completed in 1996
Hospitals in Lahore
1994 establishments in Pakistan
Memorials to Muhammad Ali Jinnah